The M5 Motorway is the most important motorway in Syria due to its length and function as the country network's south-north backbone. It is known as the "International Road." It connects the border with Jordan in the south with Damascus, the country's political capital, and continues further north through Aleppo, the country's economic capital and second largest city, to the border with Turkey in the north.

Other cities connected by this motorway are Daraa, Al Nabk, Homs and Hama. It intersects with the M4 Motorway near Saraqib, which is the main highway from Aleppo to the port of Latakia running parallel to the border with Turkey.

Syrian Civil War
Parts of the M5 have been in the control of various rebel groups in the Syrian Civil War since 2012.

In October 2019, the north of the highway became a warzone, as Turkish-backed Syrian rebel forces advanced into the Kurdish-controlled region of Rojava. Civilians had been killed near the motorway. Turkish media also reported that it was the goal of Turkey's Operation Peace Spring to reach the M4 junction with the M5 in the Turkish occupation of northern Syria.

On 14 February 2020, the Syrian Army recaptured the M5 Motorway fully for the first time since 2012 before opposition factions and Turkish forces recaptured Saraqib by 26 February and cut the highway once again on 27 February. On 1 March, Saraqib was back under Syrian Army control and also regained control of the entire motorway by 3 March.

On 8 March 2020, the M5 highway was reopened for civilian use.

See also 
Transport in Syria
Idlib demilitarization (2018–2019)

References 

Roads in Syria